The adoption of plug-in electric vehicles in the United Kingdom is actively supported by the British government through the plug-in car and van grants schemes and other incentives. About 745,000 light-duty plug-in electric vehicles had been registered in the UK up until December 2021, consisting of 395,000 all-electric vehicles and 350,000 plug-in hybrids. Until 2019, the UK had the second largest European stock of light-duty plug-in vehicles in use after Norway.

Statistics 
A surge of plug-in car sales began in Britain in 2014. Total registrations went from 3,586 in 2013, to 37,092 in 2016, and rose to 59,911 in 2018. The market share of the plug-in segment went from 0.16% in 2013 to 0.59% in 2014, and achieved 2.6% in 2018.

, the Mitsubishi Outlander P-HEV is the all-time top-selling plug-in car in the UK with almost 37,000 units registered, followed by the Nissan Leaf with nearly 24,000. Ranking third is the BMW 330e with more than 13,000 units, followed by the BMW i3 with 11,000.

, the UK had 19,108 public charging points at 6,703 locations, of which 4,391 were rapid charging points at 1,332 locations.

Government support

Speaking at the G8 summit in 2008, British Prime Minister Gordon Brown announced plans for Britain to be at the forefront of a "green car revolution". In preparation for the introduction of mass-produced electric vehicles to Britain's roads, trials of electric cars took place from 2009, with further trials in cities across the UK from 2010. Local councils were invited to submit bids to become Britain's first "green cities".

London mayor Boris Johnson also announced plans in April 2009 to deliver 25,000 electric car-charging places across the capital by 2015, in order to make London the "electric car capital of Europe". His target is to get 100,000 electric vehicles onto London's streets. Johnson also pledged to convert at least 1,000 Greater London Authority fleet vehicles to electric by 2015. Transport for London announced that all new taxis must be zero emissions capable by 2018. , there were about 3,000 plug-in electric vehicles in London, 3% of the mayor's goal, up from 1,700 electric cars in January 2009. The city also has only 1,408 charging points in operation, of which, only 57% were used in the first quarter of 2014. , Greater London postcode areas contain 8,000 electric vehicles according to the Driver and Vehicle Licensing Agency (DVLA).

Production of the Nissan Leaf at the Sunderland plant began in March 2013. The plant has the capacity to produce 60,000 lithium-ion batteries and 50,000 Leafs a year. The UK-produced Leaf, which is sold only in Europe, has an improved driving range, lower price and a more European design.

, the UK government had pledged  to support the deployment of plug-in vehicles in the five years between March 2010 and March 2015. , the UK had around 5,000 public charging points, of which, only 200 are quick chargers. By April 2014 the UK was the leader in quick-charging deployment in Europe, with 211 CHAdeMO charging stations available across the country.

As a result of lower than initially expected electric and plug-in hybrid vehicle sales, in January 2014 the UK government launched the "Go Ultra Low" national campaign in partnership with five of the largest manufacturers of plug-in electric vehicles, BMW, Nissan, Renault, Toyota and Vauxhall. The British government also announced its commitment to invest  to install more rapid charge-points to make motorway journeys by electric car feasible. According to Nicholas Clegg, Deputy Prime Minister, “Our clear objective is to move the car fleet in this country to ultra low-emission vehicles by 2040 and to put money and policy money behind it."

In July 2014 Baroness Kramer, Minister of State for Transport, announced that all of the UK government's fleets would be supplied with funding to introduce electric vehicles. Central government fleets were to benefit first, with plans to bring in over 150 plug-in cars and vans. The Government Car Service, which had 85 vehicles used by ministers, was the initial target with electric cars expected to be in operation by the third quarter of 2014. A second phase would provide funds for the public sector in general to purchase more electric vehicles. Beneficiary agencies include the National Health Service, councils and police forces. In October 2019, the Labour Party said it would aim to ban the sale of new non-electrified cars by 2030.

In 2020, the UK government announced an intention to ban sales of new petrol and diesel-powered cars (including hybrids) in 2035.

Purchase incentives

In January 2009, transport secretary Geoff Hoon said the British government would make  (~) available for consumer incentives to bring electric cars to market in the UK. The plug-in grant scheme was first announced in January 2009 by the Labour Government. The coalition government, led by David Cameron, took office in May 2010 and confirmed their support of the grant on 28 July 2010.

Two subsidy programs were implemented, the Plug-in Car Grant, from January 2011, and the Plug-In Van Grant, from February 2012. Both offer buyers of eligible vehicles a purchase subsidy discounted at the point of purchase.

Plug-in Car Grant 

The Plug-in Car Grant programme started on 1 January 2011 and is available across the UK. From 1 April 2015, the purchase price cap was raised to cover up to 35% discount of the vehicle's recommended retail price, up to the same  limit. This change means electric cars priced under , such as the Renault Zoe, are able to take advantage of most or all of the  discount. Both private and business fleet buyers are eligible for this grant, which is received at the point of purchase.

The subsidy programme is managed in a similar way to the grant made as part of the 2009 Car Scrappage Scheme, allowing consumers to buy an eligible car discounted at the point of purchase, with the subsidy claimed back by the manufacturer afterwards.

Evolution 
The government announced in April 2014 that funding for the full grant of up to  would remain in place until either 50,000 grants have been issued or 2017, whichever came first. Nevertheless, as forecasts estimated that the scheme would reached its 50,000 limit around November 2015, the government announced in August 2015 that the grant would continue until at least February 2016 for all plug-in cars with  emissions of 75 g/km of under.

The programme was extended in February 2012 to include plug-in vans. Van buyers can receive 20% – up to  – off the cost of a plug-in van.

As plug-in car sales surged during 2014 and 2015, the PICG was extended until March 2018. Hydrogen fuel cell cars became eligible for the grant.

, a total of 176,962 eligible cars have benefited from the subsidy since its launch in 2011, and at the same date the number of claims made through the Plug-in Van Grant scheme was 5,218 since the launch of the programme in 2012.

In 2018 the PICG was reduced from £4500 to £3500, and in March 2020 it was cut to £3000.

Eligibility 
Vehicles eligible for the subsidy must meet the following criteria:
 Vehicle type: Only ultra-low emission cars are eligible (vehicle category M1). Motorbikes, quadricycles and vans are not covered.
  Carbon dioxide exhaust emissions: Vehicles must emit equal or less than 75 grams of carbon dioxide per kilometre driven.
 Warranty: Vehicles must have a three-year or  vehicle warranty (guarantee) and a 3-year battery and electric drive train warranty, with the option of extending the battery warranty for an extra two years(‘drive train’ means the parts that send power from the engine to the wheels. These include the clutch, transmission (gearbox), drive shafts, U-joints and differential).
 Battery performance: Vehicles must have either a minimum five-year warranty on the battery and electric drive train as standard, or extra evidence of battery performance to show reasonable performance after three years of use
 Electrical safety: Vehicles must comply with certain regulations (UN-ECE Reg 100.00) that show that they are electrically safe.
 Crash safety: To make sure cars will be safe in a crash, they must either have: EC whole vehicle type approval (EC WVTA, not small series) or evidence that the car has appropriate levels of safety as judged by international standards

In February 2015 the government announced that to take account of rapidly developing technology, and the growing range of ultra-low emission vehicles (ULEVs) on the British market, the criteria for the plug-in car grant was updated and from April 2015, eligible ULEVs must meet criteria in one of the following categories depending on emission levels and zero-emission-capable mileage, with a technology-neutral approach, which means that hydrogen fuel cell cars are also eligible for the grant:
 Category 1:  emissions of less than 50g/km and a zero-emission range of at least .
 Category 3:  emissions of 50-75g/km and a zero-emission range of at least .

Vehicles with a zero-emission range of at least  (category 1), including hydrogen fuel cell vehicles, get a full  (~), but plug-in hybrids (categories 2 and 3) costing under  (~) receive  (~). Under the extended scheme, some plug-in hybrid sports car are no longer eligible for the grant, such as the BMW i8 because of its  (~) purchase price tag. The grant scheme will come under review when a cumulative total of 40,000 Category 1 claims, and 45,000 Category 2 and 3 combined sales have been made. Both these totals will include cars sold before March 2016.

Plug-in Van Grant 

The Plug-In Car Grant was extended to include vans since February 2012. To be eligible for the scheme, vans have to meet performance criteria to ensure safety, range, and ultra-low tailpipe emissions. Consumers, both business and private can receive the discount at the point of purchase. Also in October 2016, the government announced their commitment for an additional  to the scheme so that all vans and trucks meeting the eligibility requirements can benefit from the grant scheme. The extension of the Plug-In Van grant means that N2}} vans (3.5 – 12 tonnes gross weight) and N3 vans (over 12 tonnes gross weight) are now eligible.

The eligibility criteria for vans with a gross weight of 3.5 tonnes or less (N1 van) are:

 Vehicle type: only new vans are eligible vehicle category N1. This includes pre-registration conversions (normal, internal combustion engine vans that were converted to battery or hybrid versions by specialist converters before the car's first registration).
 Carbon dioxide exhaust emissions: vehicles must emit less than 75 grams of carbon dioxide per kilometre driven.
 Warranty: Vehicles must have a three-year or  vehicle warranty (guarantee) and a three-year battery and electric drive train warranty, with the option of extending the battery warranty for an extra two years
 Battery performance: vehicles must have either a minimum five-year warranty on the battery and electric drive train as standard or extra evidence of battery performance to show reasonable performance after three years of use
 Electrical safety: vehicles must comply with certain regulations (UN-ECE Reg 100.00) that show that they are electrically safe.
 Crash safety To make sure cars will be safe in a crash, they must either have EC whole vehicle type approval (EC WVTA, not small series) or evidence that the car has appropriate levels of safety as judged by international standards.

, the number of claims made through the Plug-in Van Grant scheme was 2,938 units since the launch of the programme in 2012, up from 1,906 made by the end of December 2015.

Home charge points 
Through the Office for Low Emission Vehicles (OLEV), the UK government provides grants towards the installation of up to two charge points at a residential address, or up to 20 at a workplace. The installer can claim 75% of the cost (including purchase, installation costs and VAT). The maximum grant for a residential point was initially capped at £1,000 then reduced to £500, and in March 2020 reduced again to £350.

Plugged-in Places

On 19 November 2009, Andrew Adonis, the Secretary of State for Transport, announced a scheme called "Plugged-in-Places", making available  to be shared between three and six cities to investigate further the viability of providing power supply for electric vehicles, and encouraging local government and business to participate and bid for funds.

The scheme offers match-funding to consortia of businesses and public sector partners to support the installation of electric vehicle recharging infrastructure in lead places across the UK. There are eight Plugged-In Places: East of England; Greater Manchester; London; Midlands; Milton Keynes; North East; Northern Ireland; and Scotland. The government also published an Infrastructure Strategy in June 2011.

London congestion charge

All-electric vehicles (BEVs) and eligible plug-in hybrid electric vehicles (PHEVs) qualify for a 100% discount from the London congestion charge. A plug-in electric drive vehicle qualifies if the vehicle is registered with the Driver and Vehicle Licensing Agency (DVLA) and has a fuel type of 'electric', or alternatively, if the vehicle is a 'plug-in hybrid' and is on the government's list of PHEVs eligible for the OLEV grant.

The original Greener Vehicle Discount was substituted by the Ultra Low Emission Discount (ULED) scheme that went into effect on 1 July 2013. The measure is designed to limit the growing number of diesel vehicles on London's roads. Mayor Boris Johnson approved the new scheme in April 2013, after taking into account a number of comments received during the 12-week public consultation that took place. About 20,000 owners of vehicles registered for the Greener Vehicle Discount by June 2013 were granted a three-year sunset period (until 24 June 2016) before they had to pay the full congestion charge.

A further phase from October 2021 will mean that only zero-emission vehicles (pure electric vehicles and hydrogen fuel cell vehicles) will qualify for the discount, which will be phased out completely from December 2025.

Field testing programmes
Field testing with 100 Smart EDs began in London in 2007. On 30 April 2009, the Electric Car Corporation put on sale the Citroën C1 ev'ie, an adapted Citroën C1 intended for city driving.

A demonstration trial with the Mini E took place between December 2009 and March 2011 with forty Mini E cars leased to private users for a two consecutive six-month field trial periods. In addition, one Mini E was delivered to the government car pool in Downing Street to be tested by ministers in an urban environment on their official business around London. The UK trial was a partnership between BMW Group UK, Scottish and Southern Energy, the South East England Development Agency (SEEDA), Oxford City Council and Oxfordshire County Council. Data collection and research was conducted by Oxford Brookes University's Sustainable Vehicle Engineering Centre throughout the UK project. Funding support was provided by the Technology Strategy Board and the Department for Transport (DFT) as part of the  UK-wide program involving trials of 340 ultra-low carbon vehicles from several carmakers. The selected test area is roughly a triangle contained within the M40 motorway between the M25 motorway and Oxford, the A34 south to the M3 motorway, and the M3 back to the M25.

The 40 Mini E electric cars were kept in use after the trial was completed in March 2011, participating in activities to promote awareness and understanding of electric vehicles. These cars were part of the BMW Group UK's official vehicle fleet of 4,000 low-emission luxury vehicles deployed for the London 2012 Olympic Games. The fleet also included 160 BMW ActiveE electric cars.

Charging infrastructure

, the UK had 19,108 public charging points at 6,703 locations, of which 4,391 were rapid charging points at 1,332 locations. According to the National Chargepoint Registry, in 2017 there were over 25 network operators (charge point owners, branded networks, such as POLAR and charge point controllers, such as Chargemaster) at a national and regional basis. , the regions with most of the infrastructure are Greater London (22.3%), Scotland (14.6%),  South East (14.1%),  South West (8.5%), North West (7.0%), and North East (6.7%).

Regional operators include Source London, ChargePlace Scotland, Plugged-In Midlands, and eCar (for Northern Ireland).

Many companies, local and regional authorities provide charging to employees and members of the public. Purchasers and lessees of electric vehicles can also claim a grant towards the installation of a charger at their home.

Sales

About 745,000 light-duty plug-in electric vehicles had been registered in the UK up until December 2021, consisting of 395,000 all-electric vehicles and 350,000 plug-in hybrids. Before the market launch of highway-capable mass production plug-in electric cars in 2010, a total of 1,096 electric vehicles were registered in the country between 2006 and December 2010. , the UK had the second largest European stock of light-duty plug-in vehicles in use after Norway.

2010–2013 

Electric car sales grew from 138 units in 2010 to 1,082 units during 2011. Before 2011, the G-Wiz quadricycle was top selling EV for several years. During 2012, a total of 2,254 plug-in electric cars were registered in the UK, of which, 1,262 were pure electrics, and sales were led by the Nissan Leaf with 699 units, followed by the Toyota Prius Plug-in Hybrid with 470 units, and the Vauxhall Ampera with 455 units sold in 2012. In addition, 279 Renault Kangoo Z.E. electric vans and 252 Renault Twizy electric quadricycles were sold through September 2012. Vehicles eligible for the Plug-in Car Grant accounted for 0.1% of total new car sales in 2012, with pure electric cars representing only 0.06%.

During 2013, a total of 3,586 plug-in electric cars were registered, up 59.0% from 2012. Of these, 2,512 were pure electric cars, up 99.0% from 2012, and 1,072 plug-in hybrids, up 8.1% from 2012. Plug-in car sales represented a 0.16% market share of the 2.26 million new cars sold in the UK in 2013. The top selling plug-in electric car during 2013 was the Nissan Leaf, with 1,812 units sold, and the Prius PHV ended 2013 as the top selling plug-in hybrid with 509 units sold, up 8.5% from 2012.

2014 

The British market experienced a rapid growth of plug-in car sales during 2014, driven by the introduction of new models such as the BMW i3, Tesla Model S, Mitsubishi Outlander P-HEV, Renault Zoe, and Volkswagen e-Up!.  The number of plug-in cars available in the market climbed from 9 models in 2011 to 18 in 2013, and to 29 models by the end of 2014. Registrations during 2014 totaled 14,518 plug-in electric cars and consisted of 6,697 pure electrics and 7,821 plug-in hybrids. Total registrations in 2014 were up 305% from 2013, with all-electric cars growing 167% while plug-in hybrid registrations were up 628% from a year earlier. The plug-in electric car segment captured a 0.59% market share of new car sales in 2014, over three times and a half the market share of 2013 (0.16%). In November 2014, with 646 all-electric cars and 1,225 plug-in hybrids registered, the segment's market share passed 1% of monthly new car sales for the first time in the UK. Again in January 2015, the segment's market share was over 1% of new car sales with 1,715 plug-in electric cars registered that month.

Nissan Leaf sales in September 2014 achieved a record of 851 units, up from 332 units the same month in 2013, representing not only the best monthly sales ever in the UK, but also the largest volume of Nissan Leafs ever sold in one month in a European country. The previous European record was achieved by Norway in March 2013 with 703 Leafs sold in that month. Sales of recently introduced BMW i3 and i8 models exceeded 1,600 units during 2014. The Outlander P-HEV was among the new models with a significant effect in the market, released in April 2014, it captured a 35.8% market share of total plug-in sales during the first half of 2014. The Mitsubishi plug-in hybrid became the top selling plug-in electric vehicle in July 2014 and captured 43% of all applications to the Plug-in Car Grants scheme that month.

The Outlander P-HEV ended 2014 as the top selling plug-in electric car in the UK that year with 5,370 units sold. Sales of the Nissan Leaf also experienced significant growth in 2014, with 4,051 units sold, up 124% from the 1,812 units sold in 2013, and ranked as the top selling all-electric car in 2014. , the Leaf continued ranking as the top selling plug-in electric car in the UK ever with cumulative sales of 7,197 units since its introduction in March 2011. Over 24,500 light-duty plug-in electric cars were registered in the country at the end of December 2014.

2015 

The surge in demand for plug-in cars continued during 2015, to the extent that 2014's ultra-low emission vehicle (ULEV) sales figure was passed in June 2015. Plug-in electric car registrations in the UK totaled 28,188 units in 2015, consisting of 9,934 pure electric cars and 18,254 plug-in hybrids. Total registrations in 2015 were up 94.0% from 2014, with all-electric cars growing 48.3% year-on-year, while plug-in hybrid registrations were up 133.0% year-on-year. Since 2011, about 54,000 plug-in electric vehicles have been registered in the UK up until December 2015, including plug-in hybrids and all-electric cars, and about 2,900 commercial vans. This figure includes a significant number of registered plug-in electric cars and vans which were not eligible for the grant schemes.

The plug-in electric car segment raised its market share of new car sales in 2015 to almost 1.1%, up from 0.59% in 2014. With almost 3,100 plug-in cars sold during December 2015, the plug-in segment reached a record of 1.7% of new car sales in the UK, the highest ever. According to the British Vehicle Rental and Leasing Association (BVRLA), the market share of all new leased cars reached 4% in 2015, while a record 4.7% of all new leased cars registered during the last quarter of 2015 was a plug-in.

Sales of the Mitsubishi Outlander P-HEV in the British market reached the 10,000 unit milestone in March 2015, allowing the plug-in hybrid to overtake the Leaf as the all-time top selling plug-in electric vehicle in the UK. Sales of the Nissan Leaf sales passed the 10,000 unit milestone in June 2015. The top selling models in 2015 were the Outlander P-HEV with 11,681 units registered, up 118% from 2014, followed by the Leaf with 5,236 units (up 29%), and the BMW i3 with 2,213 units (up 59%).

, cumulative sales of the Outlander P-HEV, the top selling plug-in car in the UK ever, totaled 17,045 units registered, and cumulative sales of the Nissan Leaf, the top selling all-electric car ever, totaled 12,433 units registered. Combined sales of the Outlander PHEV and the Nissan Leaf represent more than 50% of the British stock of plug-in electric cars sold since 2011.

2016 

Plug-in car sales in March 2016 achieved the best monthly plug-in sales volume on record ever, with 7,144 grant eligible cars registered, exceeding the previous high of 6,104 units, recorded in March 2015. The plug-in market share during this month reached 1.37% of total UK new car registrations, continuing the trend for the fifth month running of sales equal of or exceeding the 1.3% market share threshold. The surge in March sales was expected as a result of the changes in the Plug-in Car Grant scheme, which now provides a stronger incentive for pure electrics over plug-in hybrids, as the grant amount available for purchase of both types of powertrain was reduced, but the grant for plug-in hybrids was cut by half.

During the first quarter of 2016, Outlander P-HEV sales totalled 3,906 units, representing 52.3% of all plug-in hybrid registered in the UK during the quarter. By early April 2016, two years since launch, there were 21,053 Outlander P-HEVs in the UK's roads, and the plug-in SUV sales represent 36.2% of the 58,186 eligible cars registered since the grant scheme was introduced in January 2011. The sustained demand for plug-in cars over the previous 12 months through March 2016, has allowed the UK to become a leading market in the European Union for electric vehicles, ranking as the second biggest market after the Netherlands in terms of total plug-in car registrations, with 28,715 new units representing 20% of the European Union's collective plug-in sales.

Registrations during the first six months of 2016 recorded the highest-volume half-year ever for plug-in electric car registrations. A total of 19,252 plug-in electric cars were registered in the UK between January and June 2016. During the first half of 2016, the Mitsubishi Outlander PHEV was the top-selling plug-in car in the UK with 5,738 units registered. The Nissan Leaf remained the top-selling pure-electric car with 2,336 registrations.

A total of 37,092 plug-in electric vehicles were registered in 2016, of which, 35,447 cars were eligible for the Plug-in Car Grant. Registrations consisted of 10,264 all-electric cars, up 3.3% from 2015, and 26,828 plug-in hybrids, up 41.9% from the previous year. Sales of plug-in hybrids oversold pure electric cars, with the latter more than doubling sales of battery electric models. The plug-in car segment's market share reached 1.37% of new car sales in 2016. While overall new car registrations year-to-date increased 2.3% from the same period in 2015, total plug-in car registrations in 2016 increased 28.6% from a year earlier. The Outlander P-HEV continued to lead sales of the plug-in electric segment in 2016 with 9,486 units delivered. The Leaf remained as the top selling all-electric car with 4,463 units registered. The other best selling models were the Mercedes-Benz C 350 e (4,934), BMW 330e (3,499), and the BMW i3 (2,450).

By mid-October 2016, sales of the Outlander P-HEV passed the 25,000 unit mark, accounting for about 50% of all plug-in hybrid sold in the UK since 2010. , the Outlander plug-in hybrid continued ranking as the all-time top selling plug-in electric car in the UK, with 26,600 units sold since its inception. Cumulative sales of the Nissan Leaf, the second all-time best selling plug-in car and top selling all-electric car ever, passed the 15,000 unit mark in September 2016. Ranking third is the BMW i3, with almost 6,000 units sold since its inception in late 2013 through October 2016.

2017 

Registration of plug-in cars totaled 8,087 units in March 2017, surpassing the previous sales record achieved in March 2016 (7,534). In addition to the normal annual sales peak caused by the plate change, consumers rushed to complete purchases to avoid the new vehicle excise duty (VED) rates that came into force from 1 April for petrol-powered vehicles priced more than £40,000, including all plug-in hybrid models. The plug-in electric car segment reached a market share of 1.44% of new car sales in March 2017. Registrations during the first quarter of 2017 totaled 12,071 plug-in cars, consisting of 4,634 all-electric cars and 7,437 plug-in hybrids, achieving a record market share of 1.47% for that quarter.

Registrations totalled 49,182 plug-in cars in 2017, up 33% from 2016, and consisting of 35,585 plug-in hybrids and 13,597 all-electric cars, representing a market share of 1.94% of total new registrations.

2018 

Registrations totalled 59,911 plug-in electric cars in 2018, up 22% from 2017, and consisting of 44,437 plug-in hybrids and 15,474 all-electric cars, representing a market share of 2.53% of total new registrations. , the Mitsubishi Outlander P-HEV continued to rank as the most popular plug-in car, with almost 37,000 units registered, followed by the all-electric Nissan Leaf with almost 24,000 units.

2019 

, the RAC foundation reported the stock of all-electric cars in use was led by the Nissan Leaf with 28,395 units, followed by the Tesla Model 3 with 10,572, the Renault Zoe with 9,929, and the Tesla Model S with 9,534.

2020 

, the Mitsubishi Outlander P-HEV is the all-time top selling plug-in car in the UK 47,447 units registered, followed by the Nissan Leaf with 33,492 and the Tesla Model 3 with 25,574.

Top selling models by year 

The following table presents annual registrations of plug-in electric cars and vans by model between 2010 and 2013, and total registrations (cumulative) by model at the end of December 2014, and at the end of June 2016.

See also

 Electric car use by country
 Government incentives for plug-in electric vehicles
 List of modern production plug-in electric vehicles
 Neale (electric car)
 New energy vehicles in China
 Plug-in electric vehicle
 Plug-in electric vehicles in Australia
 Plug-in electric vehicles in California
 Plug-in electric vehicles in Canada
 Plug-in electric vehicles in Europe
 Plug-in electric vehicles in France
 Plug-in electric vehicles in Germany
 Plug-in electric vehicles in Japan
 Plug-in electric vehicles in the Netherlands
 Plug-in electric vehicles in Norway
 Plug-in electric vehicles in Sweden
 Plug-in electric vehicles in the United States
 Renewable energy in the United Kingdom

References

External links

 Electrek – EV and Tesla News, Green Energy, Ebikes, and more, Electric car news and reviews.
 driveEV, UK-based electric car news, reviews and resources.
 Electric car market statistics in the UK, Next Greencar.
 EV charging point map in the UK 
 Fueling British's Future, Cambridge Econometrics, March 2015.
 Go Ultra Low, official website UK campaign for ultra-low emission vehicles.
 Leading the Charge – Can Britain Develop a Global Advantage in Ultra-Low-Emission Vehicles, Institute for Public Policy Research, April 2013
 Powering Ahead – The future of low-carbon cars and fuels, the RAC Foundation and UK Petroleum Industry Association, April 2013.
 Plug-in car and van grants official website.
 Plug–in vehicles, plugged in policy?: Government Response to the Committee's Fourth Report of Session 2012–13, House of Commons of the United Kingdom, Transport Committee, January 2013.

 
United Kingdom
Road transport in the United Kingdom
Vehicles of the United Kingdom
Electric power in the United Kingdom